Allan Warner may refer to:
 Alan Warner (musician), aka Allan Warner, English musician
 Allan Warner (physician), British physician

See also
 Alan Warner (disambiguation)